Jacques Marquette, S.J. (June 1, 1637 – May 18, 1675), sometimes known as Père  Marquette or James Marquette, was a French Jesuit missionary who founded Michigan's first European settlement, Sault Sainte Marie, and later founded Saint Ignace. In 1673, Marquette, with Louis Jolliet, an explorer born near Quebec City, was the first European to explore and map the northern portion of the Mississippi River Valley.

Early life
Jacques Marquette was born in Laon, France, on June 1, 1637. He came of an ancient family distinguished for its civic and military services. Marquette joined the Society of Jesus at age 17. He studied and taught in France for several years, then the Jesuits assigned him to New France in 1666 as a missionary to the indigenous peoples of the Americas. When he arrived in Quebec, he was assigned to Trois-Rivières on the Saint Lawrence River, where he assisted Gabriel Druillettes and, as preliminary to further work, devoted himself to the study of the local languages and became fluent in six different dialects.

Explorations
In 1668, Marquette was moved by his superiors to missions farther up the Saint Lawrence River in the western Great Lakes region. That year he helped Druillettes found the mission at Sault Ste. Marie in present-day Michigan. Other missions were founded at Saint Ignace in 1671 (Mission Saint-Ignace) and at La Pointe on Lake Superior in present-day Wisconsin. At La Pointe, he encountered members of the Illinois tribes, who told him about the important trading route of the Mississippi River. They invited him to teach their people, whose settlements were mostly farther south. Because of wars between the Hurons at La Pointe and the neighboring Lakota people, Marquette left the mission and went to the Straits of Mackinac; he informed his superiors about the rumored river and requested permission to explore it.

Leave was granted, and in 1673 Marquette joined the expedition of Louis Jolliet, a French-Canadian explorer. They departed from Saint Ignace on May 17, with two canoes and five voyageurs of French-Indian ancestry.  They sailed to Green Bay and up the Fox River, nearly to its headwaters. From there, they were told to portage their canoes a distance of slightly less than two miles through marsh and oak plains to the Wisconsin River. Many years later, at that point, the town of Portage, Wisconsin was built, named for the ancient path between the two rivers. They ventured forth from the portage, and on June 17, they entered the Mississippi near present-day Prairie du Chien, Wisconsin.

The Joliet-Marquette expedition traveled to within  of the Gulf of Mexico but turned back at the mouth of the Arkansas River. By this point, they had encountered several natives carrying European trinkets, and they feared an encounter with explorers or colonists from Spain. They followed the Mississippi back to the mouth of the Illinois River, which they learned from local natives provided a shorter route back to the Great Lakes. They reached Lake Michigan near the site of modern-day Chicago, by way of the Chicago Portage. In September, Marquette stopped at Saint Francis Xavier mission in present-day Green Bay, Wisconsin, while Jolliet returned to Quebec to relate the news of their discoveries.

Marquette and his party returned to the Illinois territory in late 1674, becoming the first Europeans to winter in what would become the city of Chicago. As welcomed guests of the Illinois Confederation, the explorers were feasted en route and fed ceremonial foods such as sagamite.

Death
In the spring of 1675, Marquette traveled westward and celebrated a public Mass at the Grand Village of the Illinois near Starved Rock. A bout of dysentery he had contracted during the Mississippi expedition sapped his health. On the return trip to Saint Ignace, he died at 37 years of age near the modern town of Ludington, Michigan. After his death, natives from the Illinois Confederation returned his bones to the chapel at Mission Saint-Ignace.

A Michigan Historical Marker at this location reads:

Adjacent to gravesite of Marquette on State Street in downtown Saint Ignace, a building was constructed that now houses the Museum of Ojibwa Culture.

However, a Michigan Historical Marker in Frankfort, MI reads:

Legacy
In the early 20th century Marquette was widely celebrated as a Roman Catholic founding father of the region.

Places
 Marquette County, Michigan; Marquette County, Wisconsin
 Several communities, including: Marquette, Michigan; Marquette, Wisconsin; Marquette, Iowa; Marquette, Illinois; Marquette Heights, Illinois; Pere Marquette Charter Township, Michigan; and Marquette, Manitoba
 Marquette University and Marquette University High School in Milwaukee, Wisconsin 
 Marquette Island in Lake Huron
 Lake Marquette in Minnesota; Marquette Lake in Quebec
 Pere Marquette River and Pere Marquette Lake, which drain into Lake Michigan at Ludington, Michigan
 Marquette River in Quebec; Pere Marquette River in Michigan
 Pere Marquette Park in Milwaukee, WI
 Pere Marquette State Park near Grafton, Illinois
 Marquette Catholic High School, Alton, IL
 Marquette Park, Chicago, Illinois
 Hotel Pere Marquette, Peoria, Illinois
 Marquette Park, Gary, Indiana
 Marquette Park, Mackinac Island, Michigan
 Marquette Park, St. Louis, Missouri
 Pere Marquette Beach, a public beach in Muskegon, Michigan
 Pere Marquette State Forest, in Michigan
 The Pere Marquette Railway
 "Cité Marquette," former US-City-Base (1956–1966) built by Americans based on the NATO Air Force Base in Couvron (38th Bombardment Wing), Laon, France (his birthplace).
 Marquette Transportation Company, a towboat company using a silhouette of the Pere in his canoe as their emblem.
 Marquette Building in Chicago; Marquette Building in Detroit; Marquette Building in Saint Louis, Missouri; Pere Marquette Hotel in Peoria, Illinois
Marquette Avenue, a large street in Minneapolis, Minnesota.

Monuments
Marquette is memorialized by various statues, monuments, and historical markers:
 Father Marquette National Memorial near Saint Ignace, Michigan
 Chicago Portage National Historic Site, along with Louis Jolliet, near Lyons, Illinois
 Statues have been erected to Marquette various locations, including at Detroit, Michigan; Fort Mackinac, Michigan; Marquette, Michigan; Milwaukee, at Marquette University; Prairie du Chien, Wisconsin, Utica, Illinois; Laon, France; the National Statuary Hall of the United States Capitol; the Quebec Parliament Building
The Legler Branch of the Chicago Public Library displays "Wilderness, Winter River Scene," a restored mural by Midwestern artist R. Fayerweather Babcock. The mural depicts Marquette and Native Americans trading by a river. Commissioned for Legler Branch in 1934, the mural was funded by the Works Projects Administration.

Marquette has been honored twice on postage stamps issued by the United States:
 A one-cent stamp in 1898, part of  Trans-Mississippi Issue, which shows him on the Mississippi River; This is the first time a Catholic priest is honored by the U.S. Postal Department.
 A 6-cent stamp issued September 20, 1968, marking the 300th anniversary of his establishment of the Jesuit mission at Sault Ste. Marie.

Bibliography

Gallery

See also

 Jacques Marquette (sculpture), a 2005 public art work by artist Ronald Knepper
 Pere Jacques Marquette (Queoff), a 1987 public art work by Tom Queoff
 Sagamite
 Marquette (disambiguation) for other places, buildings and geographic objects named after Marquette
 Chicago Portage
 Chicago Portage National Historic Site

Notes

External links

 Iconographic sources of jesuit father Jacques Marquette fictitious portraits, Web Robert Derome, Professeur honoraire d'histoire de l'art, Université du Québec à Montréal.
 The Jesuit Relations and Allied Documents 1610 to 1791, including Marquette's journal (Chapters CXXXVI – CXXXVIII)
 Thwaites, Reuben G. Father Marquette New York: D. Appleton & Company, 1902.

 
1637 births
1675 deaths
17th-century French Jesuits
Burials in Michigan
Deaths from dysentery
Explorers of Canada
Explorers of the United States
French explorers of North America
French Roman Catholics
People from Laon
People of Louisiana (New France)
People of New France
Persons of National Historic Significance (Canada)